Azeez Issa Adesiji is the chairman of the Ilesa West local government area in Osun State, southwest Nigeria.

References

Nigerian politicians
People from Osun State
Living people
Year of birth missing (living people)
Place of birth missing (living people)